Whittni Morgan (née Orton; born October 22, 1997) is an American middle distance runner.

Professional
Whittni Orton Morgan represents Adidas and debuted at the 2022 Millrose Games 3000 meters.

Brigham Young University
Whittni Orton Morgan won the 2021 NCAA Division I Cross Country Championship individual title, leading BYU to a 2nd-place team finish (highest in school history). She earned 10 All-American awards as a BYU Cougars distance runner.

Fun fact
BYU All-American Whittni Orton broke the women's basketball mile record with a time of 4:58.56!

Prep
Whittni Orton is from Panguitch, Utah. Before going to BYU, she participated in Panguitch High School sports. She was honored as Utah's 2016 Female Athlete of the Year. Whittni is a three-time basketball state champion and a two-time volleyball state champion.

She was a four-time Utah High School Activities Association 1A individual cross country state champion, a 1A cross country state record holder (18:29.1 – 3 miles), and a four-time individual state champion in the 3200-meters, the 1600-meters, and the 800-meters.  
Whittni Orton won 2016 Utah High School Activities Association State Meet 1A track and field Championships in 800 meters (2:19.95 - PR), 1600 meters (5:05.23 - PR), and 3200 meters (11:08.32).
At the 2015 Utah State meet 1A, Orton placed 2nd in 400 meters (1:02.67), won 800 meters (2:23.92), won the 1600 meters (5:21.36), and won the 3200 meters (11:34.44).
At the 2014 Utah State meet 1A, Orton placed 6th in 400 meters (1:02.35), won 800 meters (2:27.69), won the 1600 meters (5:11.95), and won the 3200 meters (11:43.82).

References

External links
 Whittni Orton profile BYU Cougars
 
 

1997 births
Living people
American female middle-distance runners
BYU Cougars women's cross country runners
Track and field athletes from Utah
People from Garfield County, Utah
People from Panguitch, Utah
Brigham Young University alumni